Senad Bašić (born 26 August 1962) is a Bosnian film, theater and television actor, and comedian.

Bašić graduated from the Academy of Performing Arts in Sarajevo in 1987. He works as a professor at the Academy, specializing in acting.

Awards
Best young actor - Professional Actors Festival - 1989
"Mala liska" award - Bosnian comedy festival "Mostar liska" - 2004

Nominations
Golden Leopard (Best Actor) - 55th Locarno Film Festival - 2002

Filmography

References

External links

1962 births
Living people
Bosniaks of Bosnia and Herzegovina
Bosnia and Herzegovina male film actors
People from Trebinje
University of Sarajevo alumni
Academic staff of the University of Sarajevo
Bosnia and Herzegovina male television actors
20th-century Bosnia and Herzegovina male actors
21st-century Bosnia and Herzegovina male actors